Saturday Sun may refer to:

Saturday Sun (Vance Joy song)
Saturday Sun (Crowded House song)
Saturday Sun (Nick Drake song)